Deborah Hopkins is a British mother and political activist, honoured as one of BBC'S 100 Women in 2013, following a speech at Labour Conference which highlighted the crisis of housing poverty in Cornwall, England and its impact on families and children.

Deborah is a nurse whose career started in Glasgow, Scotland in 1984 where her experiences of supporting families at the forefront of the 1980s industrial strategy, illustrated to her the impact of politics on the lives of people far from power.

Deborah continued to work in health across the country moving into education as a lecturer and teacher in further education and higher education.

References 

Year of birth missing (living people)
Living people
BBC 100 Women